Bradley Saunders (born 4 February 1986) is a British professional boxer. As an amateur he won a silver medal in the light welterweight division at the 2010 Commonwealth Games, gold at the 2009 EU Championships and bronze at the 2007 World Championships.

Amateur career
Saunders won the British championships in 2006 whilst representing South Durham ABC..   He qualified for the 2007 World championships held in Chicago and won a bronze medal defeating the likes of local favourite Javier Molina(24:12) and Frenchman Alexis Vastine in order to join compatriots Frankie Gavin and bantam Joe Murray on the medal podiums and, in doing so, qualifying for the Beijing Olympics in 2008.

In the Olympic tournament Saunders' first round victory was followed with defeat in the second round to former victim Alexis Vastine.  Following the tournament Saunders made the decision to stay amateur whilst a number of his Team GB colleagues made the move to the professional boxing ranks.

In June 2009 Saunders returned to the ring to compete in the European Union championships held in Odense, winning gold and beating a fellow former World Championship bronze medallist Gyula Kate of Hungary along the way.

Just prior to the 2009 World Championships due to be held in Milan, Saunders broke his left thumb in a training bout.  A potential winner of gold at the event Saunders reflected on the injury by saying "I am a firm believer that everything happens for a reason...I'm going to focus totally on 2012. Maybe then I'll look back and be glad this all happened".

World Amateur Championships 
Defeated Boris Katalinic (Croatia) 23-12
Defeated Gumersindo Carrasco (Argentina) RSCO
Defeated Javier Molina (United States) 24-12
Defeated Alexis Vastine (France) 30-13
Lost to Gennady Kovalev (Russia) 8-16

Commonwealth Games 2010 
 Defeated  Anthony Taylor (New Zealand)
 Defeated  Yves Ulysse (Canada) in the quarters
 Defeated Louis Colin of (Mauritius) in a close scoring semifinal 10-7
 Lost to Manoj Kumar of (India) in the final 2-11

Olympic Games 
Defeated Samuel Kotey Neequaye (Ghana) KO 1 (2:24)
Lost to Alexis Vastine (France) 11-7

Professional career

Saunders signed his first professional contract with Frank Warren and made his professional boxing debut on 10 February 2012 against Jason Nesbitt scoring a TKO victory in the 3rd round.

Professional boxing record

| style="text-align:center;" colspan="8"|14 fights, 13 wins (10 knockouts), 1 loss (1 disqualification)
|-  style="text-align:center; background:#e3e3e3;"
|  style="border-style:none none solid solid; "|Res.
|  style="border-style:none none solid solid; "|Record
|  style="border-style:none none solid solid; "|Opponent
|  style="border-style:none none solid solid; "|Type
|  style="border-style:none none solid solid; "|Rd., Time
|  style="border-style:none none solid solid; "|Date
|  style="border-style:none none solid solid; "|Location
|  style="border-style:none none solid solid; "|Notes
|- align=center
|Win
|13–1
|align=left| Casey Blair
|TKO
|1 (6), 2:43
|2017-06-23
|align=left| Walker Activity Dome, Newcastle, Tyne and Wear
|align=left|
|- align=center
|Loss
|12–1
|align=left| Renald Garrido
|DQ
|6 (8), 2:53
|2015-09-19
|align=left| Liverpool Olympia, Liverpool, Merseyside
|align=left|
|- align=center
|Win
|12–0
|align=left| Stephane Benito
|TKO
|5 (6), 2:50
|2015-03-07
|align=left| Hull Arena, Hull, Yorkshire
|align=left|
|- align=center
|Win
|11–0
|align=left| Ivans Levickis
|PTS
|6
|2014-11-22
|align=left| Echo Arena, Liverpool, Merseyside
|align=left|
|- align=center
|Win
|10–0
|align=left| Ville Piispanen
|KO
|1 (10), 1:21
|2014-06-07
|align=left| Metro Radio Arena, Newcastle upon Tyne, United Kingdom
|align=left|
|- align=center
|Win
|9–0
|align=left| Mitch Prince
|TKO 
|4 (10), 1:10
|2014-03-29
|align=left| Metro Radio Arena, Newcastle upon Tyne, United Kingdom
|align=left|
|- align=center
|Win
|8–0
|align=left| Gyorgy Mizsei Jr
|TKO 
|4 (8), 1:00
|2013-11-22
|align=left| Leisure Centre, Gateshead, United Kingdom
|align=left|
|- align=center
|Win
|7–0
|align=left| Gareth Heard
|TKO 
|4 (8), 2:54
|2013-10-07
|align=left| Royal Lancaster Hotel, London, United Kingdom
|align=left|
|- align=center
|Win
|6–0
|align=left| Michael Kelly
|TKO 
|5 (6), 0:41
|2013-07-20
|align=left| Wembley Arena, London, United Kingdom
|align=left|
|- align=center
|Win
|5–0
|align=left| Peter McDonagh
|PTS 
|8
|2012-11-30
|align=left| Manchester Arena, Manchester, United Kingdom
|align=left|
|- align=center
|Win
|4–0
|align=left| Ivan Godor
|TKO 
|3 (6), 1:25
|2012-09-22
|align=left| Scottish Exhibition Centre, Glasgow, United Kingdom
|align=left|
|- align=center
|Win
|3–0
|align=left| Kevin McCauley
|UD 
|6
|2012-07-14
|align=left| Upton Park, London, United Kingdom
|align=left|
|- align=center
|Win
|2–0
|align=left| Danny Dontchev
|RTD 
|1 (6), 3:00
|2012-04-28
|align=left| Royal Albert Hall, London, United Kingdom
|align=left|
|- align=center
|Win
|1–0
|align=left| Jason Nesbitt
|TKO
|3 (6), 2:57
|2012-02-10
|align=left| York Hall, London, United Kingdom
|align=left|

Personal life
On 25 November 2008 Saunders was questioned by police on suspicion of dealing cocaine after a police sniffer dog found what was alleged to be £12,000 worth of the drug in his back garden.  The charges were dropped against the boxer in April 2009 when the police decided not to proceed with the case.

References

The Independent | Saunders leads rout of Hungary

External links

1986 births
English male boxers
Living people
Light-welterweight boxers
Sportspeople from Stockton-on-Tees
Boxers at the 2008 Summer Olympics
Olympic boxers of Great Britain
Commonwealth Games gold medallists for England
Sportspeople from Yorkshire
AIBA World Boxing Championships medalists
Commonwealth Games medallists in boxing
Boxers at the 2010 Commonwealth Games
Medallists at the 2010 Commonwealth Games